In enzymology, a poly(ribitol-phosphate) beta-glucosyltransferase is an enzyme that catalyzes the chemical reaction

UDP-glucose + poly(ribitol phosphate)  UDP + (beta-D-glucosyl)poly(ribitol phosphate)

Thus, the two substrates of this enzyme are UDP-glucose and poly(ribitol phosphate), whereas its two products are UDP and (beta-D-glucosyl)poly(ribitol phosphate).

This enzyme belongs to the family of glycosyltransferases, specifically the hexosyltransferases.  The systematic name of this enzyme class is UDP-glucose:poly(ribitol-phosphate) beta-D-glucosyltransferase. Other names in common use include UDP glucose-poly(ribitol-phosphate) beta-glucosyltransferase, uridine diphosphoglucose-poly(ribitol-phosphate), beta-glucosyltransferase, UDP-D-glucose polyribitol phosphate glucosyl transferase, and UDP-D-glucose:polyribitol phosphate glucosyl transferase.

References

 

EC 2.4.1
Enzymes of unknown structure